Curtis Kemp Bledsoe (born March 19, 1957 in Odessa, Texas) is a former professional American football player who played fullback, halfback, and running back. He played in the National Football League for the Kansas City Chiefs in 1981 and 1982. He later played for the Arizona Wranglers,  Washington Federals and Orlando Renegades of the USFL. Bledsoe played college football for 
the San Diego State Aztecs. Curtis is also an avid racquetball player and has played in a semi-professional capacity for many years under sponsorship by Wilson and others.

Personal life

Curtis Bledsoe currently lives in Chula Vista, California with his wife, Deborah Bledsoe. The Bledsoes have a daughter, Breanna Bledsoe, who  currently attends the Howard University School of Law.

External links
NFL.com player page

Sources
http://www.pro-football-reference.com/players/B/BledCu20.htm Curtis Bledsoe's statistics

1957 births
Living people
People from Odessa, Texas
American football fullbacks
American football halfbacks
Kansas City Chiefs players
San Diego State Aztecs football players
Washington Federals/Orlando Renegades players